MES College of Engineering (MESCE) is a Kuttippuram, Malappuram-based private engineering college. It is Kerala's first self-financing engineering college, with a campus that extends for more than a mile (1.6 km) alongside the Bharathappuzha River. It was founded in 1994 as a minority-serving institution.

The college admits students from all backgrounds, with a special focus on educationally impoverished communities. The Fabrication Laboratory (FABLAB), the MES Innovation Centre, and the Community Development Centre are just a few of the institute's major off-campus facilities. The college currently offers eight undergraduate programmes, including a Bachelor of Architecture, as well as ten postgraduate programmes in Master of Engineering, Master of Computer Applications, Master of Business Administration, and Master of Architecture.

History
The college was established along the banks of the Bharathapuzha River in 1994. It was inaugurated by the then Chief Minister, E K Nayanar in 1998. Established in 1994, the College is situated on the bank of Bharathappuzha. The college is affiliated to the APJ Abdul Kalam Technological University. This is the first self-financing engineering college in the state having Muslim minority status. 

In the year 2020, the college launched and began accepting applications for a new department, Artificial intelligence and Machine Learning, which is part of the Computer Science major.

Governing Body 
The college is run by a governing body, which is made up of representatives from the management, the Central and State governments, and industry, and is governed by the All India Council for Technical Education rules's.

Mechanism of Governance
The college's affairs are guided by the managing committee, governing body, and academic advisory board, which are composed of eminent educators and industrialists. The committee meets on a regular basis to monitor activities and take appropriate action to ensure that growth continues.

Alumni Association 
An active Alumni Association is functioning in the college.

Academics
The fall semester begins before Independence Day and ends in mid-December, while the spring semester begins in early January and ends in late May. At the moment, the college offers eight undergraduate and six postgraduate courses.

Undergraduate departments
 Architecture (B.Arch.)
 Artificial Intelligence & Machine Learning (AI)
 Civil Engineering (CE)
 Computer Science & Engineering (CSE)
 Electrical & Electronics Engineering (EEE)
 Electronics & Communication Engineering (ECE)
 Information Technology (IT)
 Mechanical Engineering (ME)

Science departments 
 Department of Chemistry
 Department of Mathematics
 Department of Physics

Postgraduate departments
 Computer Application (MCA)
 Computer Science Engineering (MCS)
 Instrumentation & Control (MIC)
 Communication Engineering & Signal Processing (MCSP)
 Construction Engineering & Management (MCM)
 Sustainable Architecture

See also

References 

Engineering colleges in Kerala
Colleges affiliated with the University of Calicut
Universities and colleges in Malappuram district
Educational institutions established in 1994
1994 establishments in Kerala